Nailbomb was a heavy metal band formed in 1993 as a side project by Brazilian musician Max Cavalera of Sepultura, Cavalera Conspiracy and Soulfly, and English musician Alex Newport of Fudge Tunnel. The band recorded one studio album, Point Blank, and played a warmup live performance and their last ever performance at the 1995 Dynamo Open Air Festival two days later, after which the band immediately disbanded.

History
Nailbomb hosted other musicians to play guest spots, including D.H. Peligro (Dead Kennedys), Max Cavalera's brother Igor Cavalera (Sepultura co-founder), and guitarist Dino Cazares (co-founder and guitarist of Fear Factory). Nailbomb's second album, Proud to Commit Commercial Suicide, was a live recording capturing the band's appearance at the 1995 Dynamo Open Air Festival in Eindhoven, the Netherlands.

The project was largely abandoned for over two decades, with no intention of the band ever reuniting or releasing any new material, until Cavalera announced in April 2017 he would play the entire 'Point Blank' on tour with his band Soulfly. Newport was not involved in the performances, citing his busy schedule as the reason. Instead, Cavalera drafted his son Igor Cavalera Jr, who had previously toured as a bassist and backing vocalist for Soulfly, to perform Newport's vocal and keyboard/sampler parts.

Band members

Members
Max Cavalera (Sepultura, Soulfly, Cavalera Conspiracy) – vocals, rhythm guitar, bass, samples
Alex Newport (Fudge Tunnel, Theory of Ruin) – vocals, lead guitar, bass, samples

Session members"Life at Dynamo DVD 2005" at artistdirect.com
Igor Cavalera (Sepultura, Cavalera Conspiracy) – drums
Andreas Kisser (Sepultura) – lead guitar
Dino Cazares (Fear Factory, Brujeria, Divine Heresy) – rhythm guitar

Live members
Igor Cavalera (Sepultura, Cavalera Conspiracy) – drums
D.H. Peligro (Dead Kennedys) – drums
Evan Seinfeld (Biohazard, Damnocracy) – bass
Rhys Fulber (Front Line Assembly, Delerium) – keyboards
Barry C. Schneider (Tribe After Tribe) – drums
Scoot (Doom) – bass
Dave Edwardson (Neurosis) - bass, backing vocals
Richie Cavalera (Incite) – rhythm guitar
Christian Olde Wolbers (Fear Factory) – bass at first live show

Discography
Studio albums

Live albums
 
Video albums

References

External links
Nailbomb guest members and biography  at VH1.com

American industrial metal musical groups
American thrash metal musical groups
Political music groups
Groove metal musical groups
Musical groups established in 1993
Musical groups disestablished in 1995
Heavy metal duos
Heavy metal supergroups